Jay Scott (1949–1993) was an American-Canadian film critic.

Jay Scott may also refer to:

Jay Scott (saxophonist) (1953–2009), American saxophonist
Jay Scott (singer), Canadian rapper and singer
Jay D. Scott (1952–2001), American murderer executed in Ohio
Jay Scott, British singer associated with the band Kingsland Road

See also
Jay Scott Prize, a Canadian film award